Royal Air Force Brüggen, more commonly known as RAF Brüggen,  in Germany was a major station of the Royal Air Force until 15 June 2001. The base was named after the village of Brüggen, the nearest rail depot. Construction began in mid-1952, which involved the clearing of forest and draining of marshland. The station became active in 1953 during the rapid expansion of NATO forces in Europe. 
The main paint shop situated next to the main runway was responsible for the surface finishing of all aircraft, ground equipment and RAF Regiment Rapier missile systems.
In 2002, it was handed over to the British Army and renamed Javelin Barracks.

317 Supply and Transport Column
In 1953, the 317 Supply and Transport Column arrived at RAF Brüggen from Uetersen. This followed the decision to supply all RAF stations in Germany through the port of Antwerp. In 1954 the unit was redesignated as a Mechanical Transport Squadron and was responsible for equipping and supplying all RAF stations in Germany and The Netherlands. The unit remained at Brüggen until 1963, when it was amalgamated into the No. 431 Maintenance Unit RAF which continued to operate until 1993. The demise of 317 MT Squadron marked the end of an era, as it had been on the continent shortly after D-Day under its previous title of 317 Supply & Transport Column. It had built itself an enviable reputation and following the cessation of hostilities carried out convoys to Prague, Warsaw and Moscow. In the 1950 Review of the Royal Air Force, the unit was described as the Carter Paterson of the autobahns.

Throughout its life, 317 carried out a number of humanitarian operations; the first being medical supplies to Bergen-Belsen. This was followed in 1947 by Operation Woodpecker in which timber and peat were supplied to the civilian population of northern Germany in one of the coldest winters on record. 
This was followed by the return of displaced persons and POWs to their home towns and cities within the British Zone. 
They were called upon again at the start of the Berlin Airlift (Operation Plain Fare), and lastly, in the winter of 1962/3, the Squadron took a convoy of fuel trucks to the oil refineries in Rotterdam for heating oil which was delivered to hospitals in Germany during the great freeze when the canals were inoperable.

1954–1998 – Strike/attack role

From 1954 – 1957 the fighter squadrons at Bruggen were 67, 71E, 112 & 130, equipped initially with Canadair Sabre F.4s, later re-equipped with the Hawker Hunters. These squadrons were either redeployed or disbanded in 1957 with the arrival of 87 Squadron, equipped with Gloster Javelins.

The initial strike capability at RAF Brüggen was provided by the English Electric Canberra from the summer of 1957. From 1969 to 1975 the Phantom FGR.2 operated in the strike/attack role and was replaced by the SEPECAT Jaguar from 9 April 1975. The squadron Jaguars were replaced by the Panavia Tornado GR.1 beginning on 13 June 1984. With a total of four Tornado GR.1 squadrons at Brüggen, and 2 more at its nearby sister airbase RAF Laarbruch, Brüggen and Laarbruch formed the largest Tornado force in NATO. Hardened Aircraft Shelters were equipped with the U.S. Weapon Storage Security System (WS3), each able to store up to 4 WE.177 tactical nuclear bombs, for delivery by Tornado aircraft.

1984 – Nuclear incident
On 4 September 2007, the British military admitted that there had been an accident with a nuclear weapon at RAF Brüggen on 2 May 1984.  The nuclear weapon fell from a transport truck, as the missile wasn't securely attached to the truck. The weapon was 8 times more powerful than the bomb that was dropped on Hiroshima in 1945. The casing was X-rayed after the incident, and found to have been undamaged. The six people who were responsible for the accident, received a reprimand for their actions in the incident.

1998–2001 – Attack role
Following reunification of Germany, the RAF announced plans to reduce its presence in the country by half. One major part of this was the reduction of Tornado squadrons in Germany from seven to four, No.9, No.14, No.17 and No.31 squadrons. No.9, No.14 and No.31 squadrons took part in the Gulf War, and later operated from Bruggen during NATO's air operations in the Kosovo War, supported by Vickers VC10 tankers.

The decision to remove all RAF assets from Germany was taken in 1996. As a result of the Strategic Defence Review No. 17 Squadron disbanded on 31 March 1999 and began the gradual drawdown of the base. No. 14 Sqn relocated to RAF Lossiemouth in January 2001. A formal ceremony on 15 June officially ended a continuous Royal Air Force presence in Germany since World War II and all of the remaining Tornados had left for RAF Marham by 4 September 2001.

Brüggen squadrons
No. 9 Squadron RAF (1 October 1986 – July 2001) – operating Panavia Tornado GR.1, GR.4.
No. 14 Squadron RAF – operating Phantom FGR.2, SEPECAT Jaguar GR.1/T.2, Panavia Tornado GR.4.
No. 17 Squadron RAF – operating Phantom FGR.2, SEPECAT Jaguar GR.1/T.2, Panavia Tornado GR.1 (1985–99).
No. 20 Squadron RAF – operating SEPECAT Jaguar GR.1/T.2.
No. 25 Squadron RAF – operating Bloodhound missiles.
No. 31 Squadron RAF – operating Phantom FGR.2, SEPECAT Jaguar GR.1/T.2, Panavia Tornado GR.1, GR.4.
No. 67 Squadron RAF (1954? – 1957) – operating Canadair Sabre F.4s and later Hawker Hunters.
No. 71 Squadron RAF (1954? – 1957) – operating Canadair Sabre F.4s and later Hawker Hunters.
No. 80 Squadron RAF – operating English Electric Canberra PR.7 (up to 1969).
No. 87 Squadron RAF (1957–1961) – operating Gloster Javelin FAW.1.
No. 112 Squadron RAF (1954? – 1957) – operating Canadair Sabre F.4s and later Hawker Hunters.
No. 130 Squadron RAF (1954? – 1957) – operating Canadair Sabre F.4s and later Hawker Hunters.
No. 213 Squadron RAF (1957–1969) – operating English Electric Canberra B(I).6.
No. 37 Squadron RAF Regiment – operating Rapier.
No. 431 Maintenance Unit RAF – 431 MU.

Handover to Army
With the Royal Air Force having no use for site of the former RAF Brüggen, the base was handed over to the British Army on 28 February 2002 to become Elmpt Station, Javelin Barracks. The 18-hole RAF Brüggen Golf Club became West Rhine Golf Club.

Former units
7th Signal Regiment
16th Signal Regiment
Support Squadron
207 Signal Squadron
230 Signal Squadron
255 Signal Squadron
628 Signal Troop
1st Military Intelligence Battalion
HQ Company
Operations Support Company
15 Military Intelligence Company
16 Military Intelligence Company

Final closure 
The barracks was closed in November 2015 and the site returned to German authorities. Since December 2015 the accommodation units have been used by the German government to house refugees.

The  area is currently owned by the Bundesanstalt für Immobilienaufgaben (BImA). In 2020 negotiations are under way to sell it to Entwicklungsgesellschaft "Energie- und Gewerbepark Elmpt" mbH (EGE), a company founded in 2016 with the objective of converting  of the area into an energy and industry park.

See also
Advanced Landing Ground
List of aircraft of the Royal Air Force
List of former Royal Air Force stations
List of Royal Air Force aircraft squadrons

References

Citations

Bibliography

External links

BBC News – RAF ends 56 years in Germany
Last days at Bruggen from AirSceneUK.org.uk
RAF Brüggen at GlobalSecurity.org
RAF Brüggen, British Army Of the Rhine – Locations
317 MT Sqn history

Military installations established in 1953
Royal Air Force stations in Germany
Military installations closed in 2001
Buildings and structures in Viersen (district)
Defunct airports in Germany
Airports in North Rhine-Westphalia